Kim Ryeo-wook (born June 21, 1987), better known by the mononym Ryeowook, is a South Korean singer, songwriter and musical actor. He is best known as a member of boy group Super Junior and its subgroups, Super Junior-K.R.Y. and Super Junior-M. Along with four other Super Junior members, he is one of the first Korean artists to appear on Chinese postage stamps. He began a solo career in 2016 with first EP The Little Prince.

Career

Pre-debut
Ryeowook was discovered through the CMB Youth ChinChin Festival in 2004 and signed a contract with SM Entertainment soon afterwards impressing the judges with his singing talent. Before Kyuhyun was added in 2006, Ryeowook was the last to join Super Junior several weeks before their debut in 2005.

2006–2009: Debut with Super Junior, K.R.Y and Super Junior-M

Ryeowook made his debut as part of the 12-member project group Super Junior 05 on 6 November 2005 on SBS' music programme Popular Songs, performing their first single, "Twins (Knock Out)". Their debut album SuperJunior05 (Twins) was released a month later on 5 December 2005 and debuted at number three on the monthly MIAK K-pop album charts.

In late 2006, Ryeowook, along with fellow Super Junior members Kyuhyun and Yesung, formed a subgroup named Super Junior K.R.Y., a group specializing in R&B ballads. The trio debuted on 5 November 2006 on KBS' Music Bank with performing Hyena soundtrack called "The One I Love". Ryeowook made his acting debut in 2007, in the film, Attack on the Pin-Up Boys, a high-school comedy/mystery film, in which he plays the eccentric vice president of the student council. He was nominated for Best Supporting Actor and Best Comedic Performance at the Korean Movie Awards.

In April 2008, he was put into seven-member sub-group Super Junior-M, a Mandopop subgroup of Super Junior for the Chinese music industry. They debuted in China at the 8th Annual Music Chart Awards, simultaneously with the release of their first music video, "U" on 8 April 2008. This was followed by the release of the debut Chinese-language studio album, Me in selected provinces in China on 23 April and 2 May in Taiwan.

In November 2012, Super Junior K.R.Y. held a concert tour in Japan, Super Junior K.R.Y. Special Winter Concert. They announced that they would be releasing their first single six years after debut. The teaser for Promise You was released on 21 November 2012, followed by the single on 23 January 2013. It debuted at number two on the Oricon's daily singles chart.

2009–2018: Solo activities
Ryeowook's first composition to be officially released was "Love U More", in the repackaged Sorry, Sorry Version C. Ryeowook made his musical theatre debut in Temptation of Wolves alongside Park Hyung-sik of ZE:A and Lim Jeong-hee. It ran from 14 July to 30 October 2011 at the COEX Artium.

On 16 and 23 June, following the footsteps of bandmates Yesung and Kyuhyun,  Ryeowook joined KBS' Immortal Songs 2 with Sunggyu of  Infinite, where singers render their own versions of songs from music legends and winners are selected by voting. He took first place in the 11 August episode where singers Lee Sang-woo and Lee Sang-eun were guests. He recorded his last episode on 16 August, which was broadcast on 25 August.

2016–present: Solo debut
Ryeowook made his solo debut on January 28, 2016.

Ryeowook's debut solo album's title is The Little Prince. The release of The Little Prince was not only anticipated as Ryeowook's first official solo album since his debut 11 years ago but it is also because it is the first release under Super Junior's own label, Label SJ, established by SM Entertainment in 2015 during the group's 10th anniversary. The title track bearing the same name as the album is a ballad inspired by French author Antoine de Saint-Exupéry's novel The Little Prince. The title track "The Little Prince" is a ballad song and a conversation between a man in pain from love and The Little Prince.

In addition to Ryeowook's solo promotions and album release, he held his first solo concert through SMTOWN's The Agit series called "Ever Lasting Star - RyeoWook" from 19 February until 21 February at the SMTOWN's Coex Artium in Samseong-dong, Seoul.

On May 3, 2022, Ryeowook released his third solo album A Wild Rose.

Artistry 
With three octaves in his range, Ryeowook is a lyric tenor. He has also been known for his frequent usage of falsettos. South Korean operatic singer Sumi Jo, whom he collaborated with for a formal performance, praised his musicianship. She called his skills "outstanding"; acknowledged his professionalism on stage.

With his second EP, Drunk on Love, Young Post noticed a variety of genres and styles interpolated: from a pop ballad-like style; jazz; R&B; and to more of a style reminiscing of lounge music.

Personal life
Ryeowook received secondary education from Deokwon Arts High School and graduated in February 2006. In the same year, he entered Inha University and graduated on 24 February 2012, with a major in theater and film studies.

Ryeowook enlisted for his military service on 11 October 2016, and was discharged on July 10, 2018.

Discography

Extended plays

Singles

Collaboration singles

Soundtrack appearances

Other charted songs

Other appearances

Filmography

Film

Television

Web shows

Musical/Theatre

Awards and nominations

Notes

References

External links

 at SM Entertainment

1987 births
Inha University alumni
Japanese-language singers of South Korea
Mandarin-language singers of South Korea
Living people
Musicians from Incheon
Singers with a three-octave vocal range
South Korean male idols
South Korean pop singers
South Korean male singers
South Korean male film actors
South Korean Roman Catholics
South Korean pianists
South Korean radio presenters
South Korean rhythm and blues singers
South Korean singer-songwriters
South Korean male television actors
South Korean television presenters
Super Junior members
Super Junior-K.R.Y. members
Super Junior-M members
21st-century South Korean singers
Male pianists
South Korean male singer-songwriters